The Legendary Prime Minister – Zhuge Liang is a Hong Kong television series based on the life of Zhuge Liang (Cantonese: Chu-kot Leung), a chancellor (or prime minister) of the state of Shu Han in the Three Kingdoms period. Starring Adam Cheng as the title character, the series not only incorporates stories about Zhuge Liang from the 14th-century historical novel Romance of the Three Kingdoms, but also includes some elements of wuxia and a fictional romance between Zhuge Liang and Xiaoqiao (Cantonese: Siu-kiu). The series was produced by ATV and first started airing in Hong Kong on 9 December 1985.

Plot

General Liu has 2 sons Liu Qi and Liu Zhong. Both sons are fine in war strategy, except that Qi is kind while Zhong is evil. Qi saves a beautiful maid, Zhi Lan. He likes her but his brother rapes her. Later Zhong ditches her. Qi gets worried when Zhi Lan has Zhong's child and disappears. Knowing that his brother is the scheming type, he gives everything up and tries to look for her with Liang. They finally find her. Zhi Lan is touched by Qi's love for her and finally marries him. Liang envies them and wonders when he will get to be with his love one day. Liu Bei seeks his help 3 times before he agrees to help him out. On his way to the camp, he meets Xiao Qiao who is beautiful and also intelligent. Both are interested in one another but Liang is disappointed to know that she is engaged to another general, Zhou Yu. Zhou Yu is angry to know that his fiancée has a change of heart and he demands to carry their wedding forward. Xiao Qiao seeks help from Liang but he ignores her. Zhou Yu is close on their heels. Out of desperation, she jumps off the cliff. Both men are alarmed upon seeing this. Liang tries to hold her hand but tears her sleeve instead. He also injures himself when both reach the bottom of the cliff. He tries to crawl close to the unconscious Xiao Qiao but Zhou Yu kicks him aside and carries her home. Xiao Qiao is sent to Huang Ying's father for treatment. Zhou Yu never leaves her alone as Xiao Qiao may die any second. Huang Ying, however, pities Liang who stands outside the hut daily to check on Xiao Qiao's condition. She starts to fall for him. Zhou Yu marries Xiao Qiao after her recovery. She is unhappy and Zhou Yu treats her coldly although he really loves her. Liang also marries Ying but he sets his mind to put his heart in his work to manage his master's state to help his son. He gets along well with Kwan Yu and Zhang Fei. He thinks of very good war strategies to control the other states. Being a martial arts expert himself (can you believe it?), he is also a master of traps. He finds Qi but Qi declines to help as he is happy to settle in a village with his family and son. In the meantime, Zhong joins Cao Cao's army. The Wei state thus becomes the strongest among the three. Zhou Yu and Liang often see each other and they often have verbal attacks. Cao Cao is glad to see this and he plans to grab the other 2 states when he gets the chance. After all these years, the other people have aged, except for Xiao Qiao. Why? To save her life, Ying's father has to give her a valuable drug that keeps her youth all along. Ying is amazed to see how Xiao Qiao remains the same all these years while she ages so much. She can see how much Liang still loves her and feels inferior of herself. She finally dies miserably, urging Liang not to give Xiao Qiao up. Zhou Yu helps his master, Sun Quan, after the elder ruler Sun Che dies. Being younger and inexperienced, he always listens to Zhou Yu's advice. Liang also helps Liu Bei's son, Ah Dou, who is a stupid man. He ages so much as he takes charge of everything in the war after his masters' death. Zhou Yu fails in several attempts to seize Liu Bei's state. He is seriously injured in an attack. However, he is very upset that Xiao Qiao doesn't say that she likes him all these years. Even though she takes care of him, she doesn't say these words even till the day of his death. Cao Cao also becomes an unhappy man after he causes his favourite son, Cao Zhi's death. Cao Pi throws discord among them and he is remorseful over it. He starts to wonder the point of having wars and stops. Liang and Xiao Qiao are finally together. But Liang is dying too as he reveals too many predicted secrets. Xiao Qiao is upset but they decide to spend the remaining days happily together.

Cast
 Note: Some of the characters' names are in Cantonese romanisation.

 Adam Cheng as Chu-kot Leung
 Michelle Yim as Siu-kiu
 Yip Yuk-ping as Wong Ying
 Hung Tak-sing as Lau Bei
 Cheng Lui as Kwan Yu
 Choi Kwok-hing as Cheung Fei
 Tong Chun-chung as Chiu Wan
 Wong Wai as Cho Cho
 Tong Pan-cheung as Cho Pei
 Kam Tung as Sze-ma Yi
 Wai Lit as Suen Tsak
 Ng Si-tak as Suen Kuen
 Law Lok-lam as Chow Yu
 Chan Choi-yin as Dai-kiu
 Szema Wah Lung as Lau Biu
 Kenny Ho as Lau Kei
 Yeung Chung-yan as Lau Tsung
 Ling Man-hoi as Chu-kot Yuen
 Kwan Tze-biu as Chu-kot Gan
 Pau Hon-lam as Wong Sing-yin
 Cho Tat-wah as Pong Tak-gung
 Lee Hang as Lou Suk
 Kam San as Lui Mung
 Cheng Wai-lun as Luk Sun
 Tong Kam-tong as Ngai Yin
 Cheng Shu-fung as Cheung Liu
 Chan Leung as Sing Yuk
 Leung Ming as Cheung Bo
 Law Shek-ching as Mang Wok
 Ben Ng as Lee Din
 Au Hoi-ling as Lee Tze-lan
 Tsang Wai-kuen as Pong Tung
 Cheung Tin-wai as Liu Fa
 Ling Fei-lik as Chow Chong
 Yeung Tak-si / Lee Ka-ho as Keung Wai
 Ngo Lung as Wah To
 Eric Wan as Fan Or
 Ng Wing-sam as Choi Mo
 Tam Siu-mei as Lady Choi
 Berg Ng as Shek Kwong-yuen
 Hui Ying-sau as Elder Kiu
 Chan Mei-yee as Lady Kam
 Lau Suk-fong as Lady Mei
 Kwan Ka-lai as Kwan Yu's wife
 Yau Pui-ling as Cheung Fei's wife
 Tam Tak-sing as Hon Hin Dai
 Tang Pik-yuk as Consort Tung
 Ng Wui as Yuen-kei To-yan
 Kong To as Bak-duk San-mo
 Fan Wing-wah as East Cave Master
 Chan Lai-yau as South Cave Master
 Keung Wai-kwong as West Cave Master
 Tsang Tsan-on as North Cave Master
 Fong Kwok-san as Nanman woman

See also
 Zhuge Liang (TV series)
 List of media adaptations of Romance of the Three Kingdoms

External links

Asia Television original programming
1985 Hong Kong television series debuts
1985 Hong Kong television series endings
Television series set in the Eastern Han dynasty
Television series set in the Three Kingdoms
Works based on Romance of the Three Kingdoms
Cantonese-language television shows